Dalongkoua fuae is a Chinese whaitsiid therocephalian of the Late Permian.

References

Whaitsiids
Therocephalia genera
Fossil taxa described in 2017